Christoforos Stefanidis (alternate spelling: Christophoros, ; born July 28, 1980), is a Greek professional basketball player.

Professional career
Stefanidis played two seasons with Kolossos Rodou of the Greek Basket League, from 2013 until 2015. In the 2013–14 season, he averaged 8.5 points, 2 assists, and 1 rebound per game, in the Greek League. He moved to the Greek club Lavrio, in 2016.

References

External links
 FIBA Europe Profile
 EuroCup Profile
 Eurobasket.com Profile
 Draftexpress.com Profile
 Balkan League Profile
 Greek Basket League Profile 
 Greek Basket League Profile 
 Stefanidis Christoforos (Aris- Kolossos 22/11/14) - Youtube.com Video 
 

1980 births
Living people
Apollon Patras B.C. players
Arkadikos B.C. players
Greek men's basketball players
HANTH B.C. players
Kavala B.C. players
Kolossos Rodou B.C. players
Lavrio B.C. players
Maroussi B.C. players
Palaio Faliro B.C. players
Point guards
Rethymno B.C. players
Shooting guards
Basketball players from Athens